Partner (also known as Croft's Partner or Old Partner) was a British Thoroughbred racehorse and sire. He won six of his seven races before being retired to stud where he was the Leading sire in Great Britain and Ireland four times, and continued the Byerley Turk sire-line.

Racing career
Partner's breeder sold him to Mr. Cotton of Sussex, who in turn sold him to Lord Halifax. Lord Halifax raced the colt with great success over four mile courses. He was unbeaten in 1723 and 1724, taking the following year off to come back to the track in 1726, beating Sloven in a match race. His only loss was in a race in 1728 to Smiling Ball, after which he was sold to John Croft to begin his breeding career.

Stud career
His most important son was Tartar, who went on to sire the very influential Herod. He also sired Cato, Golden Ball, Sedbury, Morton's Traveller, (b c 1746 - exported to United States and a good sire there) and Traveller (1735), as well as the dam of Matchem, before his death at 29.

Pedigree

Sire line tree

Partner
Sly (Bumper)
Pembed
Partner (Grisewood)
Partner (Moore)
Grey Spot
Ploughboy
Partner
Lycurgis
Plunder
Barforth
Cato
Little John
Freeholder
Achilles
Little John (Constable)
Spectre
Sedbury
Soldier
Alfred
Tantivy
Bumper
Stilts
Badsticks
Almanzor
Golden Ball
Skeleton
Looby
Merry Andrew
Stroker
White Stockings
Badger
Badger (Sedley)
Dart
Baboon
Mettle
Mixbury
Bedlam
Little John (Croft)
Pompey
True Blue
Cheshire Tom
Tartar
Lucifer
Miner
Beaufremont
Favourite
Herod
Florizel
Crookshanks
Diomed
Ulysses
King William
Admiral
Fortunio
Fidget
Bustler
Prizefighter
Eager
Slapbang
Tartar
Ninety-three
Contractor
Evergreen
Holyhock
Apothecary
Bazaglo
Maximin
Alexis
Antipas
Magnet
Windlestone
Daredevil
Magnetic Needle
Telemachus
Boston
Plunder
Postmaster
Aurelius
Fitzherod
Mufti
Rebel
Warwick
Woodpecker
Bullfinch
Farmer
Seagull
Buzzard
Chanticleer
Dragon
Hawk
Ostrich
Tom Tit
Young Woodpecker (Massey)
Young Woodpecker
Gladish
Vivaldi
Bonaparte
Brother to Vivaldi
Bourdeaux
Grey Highlander
Clown
Blossom
Fulmine
Highflyer
Delpini
Rockingham
Noble
Sir Peter Teazle
Spadille
Escape
Traveller
Skyscraper
Walnut
St. George
Oberon
Moorcock
Diamond
Justice
Douglas
Justice
Mentor
Rhadamanthus
Daedalus
Il-Mio
Scorpion
Adamant
Guildford
Hero
Phillador
Prince Ferdinand
True Blue
Boxer
Hammer
Weazle
Boxer
Fencer
Whipcord
Wickham
Fencer
Anvil
St. George
Cymbeline
Drone
Arra Kooker
Constitution
Young Drone
Lounger
Chance
Honeycomb
Emperor
Fortitude
John Bull
Tom Tugg
Cornet
Commodore
Guido
Pantaloon
Columbus
Argos
Gambler
Slender
Snake
Bagot
Master Bagot
Drone
Swindler
Loyal
Balance
Challenger
Phoenomenon
Ambidexter
Stride
Comet
Diomed (Tate)
Huby
Restless
Standard
Wonder
Firetail
Stripling
Punch
Herod (Harpur)
Spectre
Posthumus
Monckton
Nimrod
Smiling Ball
Tartar (Wildman)
Cream of Tartar
Little John
Venture
Tom Jones
Traveller
Young Traveller (Coatsworth)
Skim
Dainty Davy
David
Hambletonian
Gilkicker
Hercules
Pilot
Pilot
Smoker
Pineapple
Prince William
Privateer
Young Traveller (Fermor)
Squirrel
Firetail
Hippolitus
Squirrel (Carlisle)
Cossus
Weazel
Touchstone
Labyrinth
Slim
Houghton
Snail
Traveller (Morton)
Ariel
Partner (Lightfoot)
Mark Anthony
Standard
Romulus
Chatham
Collector
Pennsylvania Farmer
Sloe
Rockingham
Bashaw
King Alfred
Virginia Cade
Partner (Beckham)
Gander Neck
Fitzpartner
Norval
Nonpareil
Nonpareil
Pegasus
Yorick
Junius
Spangloss
Polyphemus
Arion
Cub
Driver
Tryol
Apollo
Bellair
Silverlegs
Tristram Shandy
Traveller (Burwell)
Lycurgus
Traveller (Lloyd)
Traveller (Heath)
Leonidas
True Briton
Justin Morgan

See also
List of leading Thoroughbred racehorses

References

1718 racehorse births
Thoroughbred racehorses
Racehorses trained in the Kingdom of Great Britain
Racehorses bred in the Kingdom of Great Britain
Thoroughbred family 9-a
Byerley Turk sire line